Xylota stylata is a species of hoverfly in the family Syrphidae.

Distribution
Java.

References

Eristalinae
Insects described in 1944
Taxa named by Frank Montgomery Hull
Diptera of Asia